Morona Canton is a canton of Ecuador, located in the Morona-Santiago Province.  Its capital is the town of Morona.  Its population at the 2001 census was 5,065.

References

Cantons of Morona-Santiago Province